Luca Verdini (born 18 February 1985 in Pesaro) is an Italian motorcycle racer.

Career statistics

Grand Prix motorcycle racing

By season

Races by year
(key)

References

External links

1985 births
Living people
Italian motorcycle racers
125cc World Championship riders
People from Pesaro
FIM Superstock 1000 Cup riders
Sportspeople from the Province of Pesaro and Urbino